The Best Damn Rap Show is a collaborative studio album by Vast Aire and Mighty Mi. It was released on Eastern Conference Records in 2005.

Critical reception

Andy Kellman of AllMusic gave the album 3 stars out of 5, commenting that "Mighty Mi's beats are a good match for Vast, packing all the necessary grit and disorienting ambiance, but the album lacks The Cold Veins dark edge." Nathan Rabin of The A.V. Club stated, "Mi is the sonic auteur behind Rap Shows grimy B-movie atmospherics, but Aire brings the verbal pyrotechnics."

IGN included it on the "Top 26 Albums of 2005" list.

Track listing

Personnel
Credits adapted from liner notes.

 Vast Aire – vocals
 Mighty Mi – production, turntables, recording
 DJ Cip One – turntables (2)
 Tame One – vocals (6)
 Joey Raia – mixing
 Michael Perez-Cisneros – mastering
 B. Smith – design, illustration
 Trevor Traynor – photography

References

External links
 

2005 albums
Collaborative albums
Vast Aire albums
Eastern Conference Records albums